Malobika Banerjee is a Bengali actress performed in Oriya films also.She also participated in Bigg Boss Bangla

Career
In 2018 Malobika Banerjee started her Bollywood career with a Hindi music video named “Dilbar” singer Shahid Mallya from Zee music label. On 2018 she worked another super hit music video “Pretty Girl” singer Kanika kapoor from T- series music label. In 2018 Malobika Banerjee featured in cover page of Famous Filmfare magazine. She acted in movies like Chorabali, Katmundu and Mister Bhaduri. She has also done Odia movies such as Mate bohu kari Nei ja, Dele Dhara katha Sare.

Filmography

References

External links
 

Living people
Bengali actresses
Actresses from Kolkata
Year of birth missing (living people)
Actresses in Bengali cinema
Indian film actresses
21st-century Indian actresses